The women's 5000 metres walk event at the 1988 World Junior Championships in Athletics was held in Sudbury, Ontario, Canada, at Laurentian University Stadium on 31 July.

Medalists

Results

Final
31 July

Participation
According to an unofficial count, 26 athletes from 18 countries participated in the event.

References

5000 metres walk
Racewalking at the World Athletics U20 Championships